RAF Barnham (also called Barnham Camp) is a Royal Air Force station situated in the English county of Suffolk  south of the Norfolk town of Thetford. It is located to the north of the village of Barnham on Thetford Heaths. The camp is a satellite station of RAF Honington.

During the 1950s and 60s a part of RAF Barnham was set aside as high-security storage facility for nuclear weapons. This area of the site is now a scheduled monument. Earlier than that, Barnham had been used as a chemical weapons store and filling station from 22 August 1939. In 1966, the nuclear weapons storage facility was put up for sale, and now forms the privately owned Gorse Industrial Estate. The chemical weapon store and former chemical weapon filling station are situated at Little Heath, Barnham down the dead-end Station Road.

Location
The present main gate of RAF Barnham can be found directly off Bury Road (A134) between Barnham village and Thetford. The entrance to the former nuclear weapons store (now Gorse Industrial Estate) can be found on Elveden Road between Barnham village and the A11.

History
Military facilities had existed at Barnham since the First World War, when tanks were tested at Little Heath and mustard gas was produced at Triangle Plantation. During the Second World War, RAF Barnham ran Forward Filling Depot 1, which took bulk deliveries of mustard gas from M. S. Factory, Valley and used it to fill bombs and shells.

During 1953 or 1954, construction began on a high-security RAF bomb store on Thetford Heath. The site was to become known as RAF Barnham and construction was completed in 1955 with the site operational from September 1956. Barnham was constructed as a sister-site to a similar facility constructed a few years before at RAF Faldingworth. Both sites were built to store and maintain free-fall nuclear bombs and Barnham was able to supply the bomber squadrons at Honington, Marham, Watton, Wyton, Upwood and Bassingbourn. Barnham came under the control of the RAF's No. 94 Maintenance Unit.

The operational life of Barnham was relatively short. By the early 1960s this type of storage facility became obsolete as free-fall nuclear bombs were superseded as the weapon of choice, for the British nuclear deterrent, by the Blue Steel stand-off missile. The storage and maintenance of nuclear weapons moved to the V bomber airfields. The last nuclear weapons were probably removed from the site by April 1963. The site was sold in 1966, and since that date it has been used as a light industrial estate.

Future closure
A Better Defence Estate, published in November 2016, indicates that the Ministry of Defence will dispose of the site by 2020. Domestic accommodation will be relocated to RAF Honington, with access to Barnham Training Area maintained. This was later extended to 2022, and once more to 2027.

Nuclear weapons storage

The site was built specifically to store and maintain free-fall nuclear bombs, such as Blue Danube. This specific purpose was reflected in the facility's layout: The site was roughly pentagonal in shape. It consisted of three large non-nuclear component stores, surrounded by earthwork banking and a number of smaller storage buildings to hold the fissile cores; the cores were held in stainless steel containers sunk into the ground. The larger buildings stored the bomb casings and the high-explosive elements of the weapons.

The smaller stores (known as "Hutches") were constructed to hold the fissile core of the weapons. These hutches were further divided into type 'A' and 'B'. The 'A' type hutches having a single borehole for the storage of plutonium cores and the 'B' type hutches having a double borehole for storing cobalt cores. In total, there were 55 hutches giving enough capacity to store 64 fissile cores. Barnham had sufficient storage capacity for 132 fissile cores although it's likely that only a small number were ever stored there as only 25 Blue Danube bombs were ever built at a cost of £1M per bomb.

In addition to the storage buildings, the site consisted of a number of other buildings including a fire station, RAF Police flight, administration block, mess block, mechanical transport section, kennels and workshops. The perimeter of the site was protected by a double system of chain-link fencing and an inner concrete-panel wall; all of which were topped with barbed wire. In 1959, security was enhanced by the building of watch towers around the perimeter.

The former nuclear bomb storage facilities are designated as a scheduled monument by English Heritage. Several buildings on the site have listed building status.

Current use
RAF Barnham is a satellite station of RAF Honington and is used by the RAF Regiment for training. It is used as an accommodation and training venue for the Potential Gunners Acquaintance Course (PGAC). The adjacent MoD Training Area remains the property of the Ministry of Defence, and is still used by the RAF Regiment, as well as the Air Training Corps and Combined Cadet Force for training.

See also 

 List of Royal Air Force stations
 Nuclear weapons of the United Kingdom

References

External links

Royal Air Force stations in Suffolk